The 2016 FIBA Africa Under-18 Championship was the 20th edition, played under the rules of FIBA, the world governing body for basketball, and the FIBA Africa thereof. The tournament was hosted by Rwanda from July 22 to 31, with the games played at the Amahoro Stadium in Kigali.

Angola defeated Egypt 86–82 in the final to win their 4th title. The tournament qualified all three medallists to the 2017 Under-19 World Championship.

Squads

Draw

Preliminary round 

All times are local (UTC+2).

Group A

Group B

Knockout stage
All times are local (UTC+2).
Championship bracket

5-8th bracket

9-11th bracket

Quarter finals

9−11th place classification

9th place match

5–8th place classification

Semifinals

7th place match

5th place match

Bronze medal match

Final

Final standings

Awards

All-Tournament Team

Statistical Leaders

Individual Tournament Highs

Points

Rebounds

Assists

Steals

Blocks

Turnovers

2-point field goal percentage

3-point field goal percentage

Free throw percentage

Individual Game Highs

Team Tournament Highs

Points

Rebounds

Assists

Steals

Blocks

Turnovers

2-point field goal percentage

3-point field goal percentage

Free throw percentage

Team Game highs

See also
 2015 FIBA Africa Under-16 Championship

External links
Official Website
Afrobasket Profile

References

FIBA Africa Under-18 Championship
2016 in Rwandan sport
2016 in African basketball
International basketball competitions hosted by Rwanda